Hajji Moharam Khan Nasiri is a member of the Meshrano Jirga, the upper house of Afghanistan's National Assembly, for Laghman Province.
He is the secretary of the Rules Committee.

References

Members of the House of Elders (Afghanistan)
Living people
Year of birth missing (living people)